The Spring of Youth is an old water source in Changhua City, Changhua County, Taiwan. It used to be the slow-filtered and fresh water ponds of the old water source for the city.

History
In its early time, the water source of the place was abundant and endless, thus earning itself the name the Spring of Youth.

Architecture
There are two porticoes in front of the ponds built in decorative elements of renaissance style. They are engraved with the words Spring of Youth and Sweet Dew from Genius Loci.

Transportation
The spring is accessible south east from Changhua Station of Taiwan Railways.

See also
 List of tourist attractions in Taiwan

References

Buildings and structures in Changhua County
Changhua City
Tourist attractions in Changhua County
Water supply and sanitation in Taiwan